"Fannie Mae" is a 1959 song, written and performed by the American blues and R&B singer, Buster Brown.

The track made it into the Top 40 of the US Pop Singles Chart, and to #1 on the US Billboard R&B chart in April 1960.

Chart performance
 US Billboard R&B Chart (#1)
 US Billboard Hot 100 (#38)

In popular culture
The song is featured in the film American Graffiti (1973).

Recorded versions
Joey Dee and the Starliters (1962 - Doin' the Twist - Live at the Peppermint Lounge LP)
The Rolling Stones
Robbie Lane and the Disciples (1964)
The Righteous Brothers (1964)
The Steve Miller Band (1968)
Domenic Troiano (1973)
Gene Summers (1975)
James Cotton (1975)
Southside Johnny & The Asbury Jukes (1976)
Magic Slim (1982)
Jaco Pastorius (1983)
Elvin Bishop (1991)
Canned Heat (1994)
Carl Weathersby (1996)
Mel Brown (guitarist) (2001)
Booker T. & the MG's (2003)
Gary U. S. Bonds (2004)
Coco Montoya (2010)
Playing for Change (Playing for Change Live) (2010) CD
Jello Biafra (2011)
Gene "Birdlegg" Pittman (2013)
Shawn Holt & the Teardrops (2013)

References

1959 singles
Gene Summers songs
Rhythm and blues songs
1959 songs